Göran Larsson may refer to:

 Göran Larsson (theologian)
 Göran Larsson (swimmer)